The Townsville mutiny was a mutiny by African American servicemen of the United States Army while serving in Townsville, Australia, during World War II.

About 600 African American troops from the 96th Battalion, US Army Corps of Engineers, were stationed at a base outside of Townsville called Kelso Field. They were a labour battalion and their main job was to build bridges and barracks. On 22 May 1942, aiming to kill their commander, Captain Francis Williams of Columbus, Georgia, the black troopers began firing machine guns at the tents of white officers, resulting in an eight-hour siege. At least one person was killed and dozens severely injured, and Australian Army soldiers were called in to roadblock the rioters.

American journalist Robert Sherrod wrote a report on the mutiny but it was suppressed, as future US president Lyndon B. Johnson, then a young congressman, was visiting Townsville at the time. The mutiny was revealed by a historian in 2012.

References

External links
Townsville mutiny and Black Soldier riots
Report on the mutiny at Oz at War

1942 in Australia
1942 riots
Conflicts in 1942
Military history of Australia during World War II
African-American history of the United States military
Mutinies in World War II
Riots and civil disorder in Queensland